The Av8er Orbiter is a British paramotor that was designed by Paul Taylor and produced by Av8er Limited of Woodford Halse, Northamptonshire for powered paragliding. Now out of production, when it was available the aircraft was supplied complete and ready-to-fly.

Design and development
The Orbiter was designed to comply with the US FAR 103 Ultralight Vehicles rules as well as European regulations. It features a paraglider-style wing, single-place accommodation and a single engine in pusher configuration. The aircraft is built with special attention to balancing and vibration isolation. The cage assembly includes small wheels to ease ground movement of the motor unit.

As is the case with all paramotors, take-off and landing is accomplished by foot. Inflight steering is accomplished via handles that actuate the canopy brakes, creating roll and yaw.

Variants
Orbiter Lite
Model with a  Radne Raket 120 Aero ES engine in pusher configuration with a 4:1 ratio reduction drive and a  diameter two-bladed wooden propeller.
Orbiter XP
Base model circa 2005.
Orbiter XPE
Model with electronic starting.
Orbiter XPR Light
Model with Radne Raket 120 engine.

Specifications (Orbiter Lite)

References

Observer Light
2000s British ultralight aircraft
Single-engined pusher aircraft
Paramotors